Connie Claussen is an American former softball player and professor of physical education at the University of Nebraska at Omaha.

Biography
Claussen received her early education from Omaha Benson High School. She obtained a bachelor's degree from Omaha University and a master's degree from Adams State College.

Between 1963 and 1998, Claussen was a professor of physical education at the University of Nebraska at Omaha.

In 1979, as a manager of the United States women's national softball team, her team won the gold medal at the Pan American Games. 

University of Nebraska at Omaha softball complex is named after her. She is considered a softball pioneer.

Recognition
 Charles Mancuso Award
 National Fast Pitch Coaches Association Hall of Fame
 Old Timers Baseball Hall of Fame
 UNO Athletic Hall of Fame
 Omaha Softball Association Hall of Fame
 Omaha Sports Hall of Fame

References

Living people
American softball players
University of Nebraska Omaha alumni
University of Nebraska Omaha faculty
Adams State University alumni
Year of birth missing (living people)
Place of birth missing (living people)